KIAA0930 is a protein that, in humans, is encoded by the KIAA0930 gene.

References

External links

Further reading

Uncharacterized proteins